Jisu or ji-su, or variation, may refer to:

 Ji-su, Jisu, Ji Su, Ji-Su, Jee-Soo, Ji-Soo, Jee-Su a Korean given name
 Jesus (name), spelled in Fijian and in Garo as "Jisu"
 Jisu former name (10th century) for Tianjin
 Jisu a fictional character in Dragonball, see List of Dragon Ball characters

See also
 Suji (disambiguation), including Su-Ji values
 Su (disambiguation)
 Ji (disambiguation)